Perfect Combination is a collaboration album by American contemporary R&B singers Stacy Lattisaw and Johnny Gill, released on February 13, 1984, via Cotillion Records. The album peaked at number 139 on the Billboard 200. Three singles were released from the album: "Perfect Combination" / "Heartbreak Look", "Block Party" and a cover of the Shirelles' "Baby It's You". "Perfect Combination" / "Heartbreak Look" was the only single from the album to chart on the Billboard Hot 100, peaking at number 75 in 1984.

Track listing

Personnel
Stacy Lattisaw – lead and backing vocals
Johnny Gill – lead and backing vocals
Narada Michael Walden – percussion, drums, keyboards, Simmons drums, computer sequencing, sequencing 
Randy Jackson – bass
Preston Glass – acoustic guitar, glockenspiel, backing vocals 
Bobby Black – pedal steel, slide guitar 
David Sancious – piano, keyboards
Frank Martin – synthesizer, keyboards
Joaquin Lievano, Corrado Rustici  – guitar
Alan Glass – electric guitar
Marc Russo – saxophone
Mingo Lewis – percussion
Vicki Randle, Jim Gilstrap, Bonnie Boyer, Myrna Matthews, Carla Vaughn, Linda Imperial, Kevin Walden, Ben E. Epps, Dennis Saunders, Frank Loverde, Yolanda Glass, Leslie Ann Jones, John Lehman – backing vocals

Chart positions

References

External links
 
 

1984 albums
Albums produced by Narada Michael Walden
Johnny Gill albums
Stacy Lattisaw albums
Vocal duet albums